Ivo Smoje (born 21 November 1978) is a Croatian retired footballer who primarily played for hometown club Osijek.

External links
 
Ivo Smoje at hrsport.net 

1978 births
Living people
Footballers from Split, Croatia
Association football defenders
Croatian footballers
NK Grafičar Vodovod players
GNK Dinamo Zagreb players
NK Croatia Sesvete players
NK Osijek players
HNK Hajduk Split players
Croatian Football League players